Karolin Braunsberger-Reinhold (born 3 November 1986) is a German politician from the Christian Democratic Union. She has been a Member of the European Parliament since 2021. In 2022, she joined the Committee of Inquiry to investigate the use of Pegasus and equivalent surveillance spyware.

References 

Living people
1986 births
21st-century German women politicians
Christian Democratic Union of Germany MEPs
MEPs for Germany 2019–2024
21st-century women MEPs for Germany